Marthinsen is a surname. Notable people with the surname include:

Finn Kristian Marthinsen (born 1946), Norwegian politician
Jim Marthinsen (born 1956), Norwegian ice hockey player
Karl Marthinsen (1896–1945), Norwegian Army commander
Mariann Marthinsen (born 1984), Norwegian cross-country skier and swimmer
Marianne Marthinsen (born 1980), Norwegian politician 
Niels Marthinsen (born 1963), Danish composer
Ole Marthinsen (1928–2003), Norwegian bandy player